The 1983 Pan American Games, officially known as the IX Pan American Games, were a continental multi-sport event held in Caracas, Venezuela, from August 14 to August 29, 1983. At the Games, 3,426 athletes selected from 36 National Olympic Committees (NOCs) participated in events in 22 sports. Twenty-one nations earned medals during the competition, and thirteen won at least one gold medal.

Medal table 

The ranking in this table is based on medal counts published by several media organizations. By default, the table is ordered by the number of gold medals won by the athletes representing a nation. (In this context, a nation is an entity represented by a NOC). The number of silver medals is taken into consideration next and then the number of bronze medals. If nations are still tied, equal ranking is given and they are listed alphabetically by IOC country code.

To sort this table by nation, total medal count, or any other column, click on the  icon next to the column title.

Notes 

  Some sources appoint that the United States actually achieved 148 gold medals, 101 silver medals and 53 bronze medals, while others count 137, 92 and 56, respectively. This would result in a total of 302 medals earned by American athletes during the Games.
  Some reports say that Cuba earned 78 gold medals, 51 silver medals and 45 bronze medals, instead of 79, 53 and 43, respectively. This would result in a total of 176 medals. Another source appoint 80 gold medals, 49 silver medals and 45 bronze medals. This would result in a total of 174 medals earned by Cuban athletes during the Games.
  Some sources appoint that Canada achieved 22 gold medals, 42 silver medals and 55 bronze medals, instead of 18, 44 and 47, respectively. This would result in a total of 119 medals earned by Canadian athletes during the Games.
  Some reports say that Venezuela placed fourth in the medal table, ahead of Brazil, after achieving 14 gold medals, 25 silver medals and 37 bronze medals. This would result in a total of 76 medals earned by Venezuelan athletes during the Games. However, the Brazilian Olympic Committee (BOC) confirm that Brazil placed fourth.

References 

General

 

Specific

See also 

Medal table
Pan American Games medal tables